Komárom is a district in north-western part of Komárom-Esztergom County. Komárom is also the name of the town where the district seat is found. The district is located in the Central Transdanubia Statistical Region.

Geography 
Komárom District borders with the Slovakian region of Nitra to the north, Tata District to the east, Oroszlány District and Kisbér District to the south, Győr District (Győr-Moson-Sopron County) to the west. The number of the inhabited places in Komárom District is 9.

Municipalities 
The district has 3 towns, 1 large village and 5 villages (ordered alphabetically, as of 1 January 2013):

The bolded municipalities are cities, italics municipality is large village.

Demographics

In 2011, it had a population of 39,863 and the population density was 105/km2.

Ethnicity
Besides the Hungarian majority, the main minorities are the Roma (approx. 350), German (250) and Slovak (150).

Total population (2011 census): 39,863
Ethnic groups (2011 census):
Hungarians: 34,121 (96.72%)
Gypsies: 352 (1.00%)
Others and indefinable: 806 (2.28%)
Did not declare their ethnic group: approx. 4,500 persons

Religion
Religious adherence in the county according to 2011 census:

Catholic – 13,637 (Roman Catholic – 13,489; Greek Catholic – 141);
Reformed – 7,013;
Evangelical – 427; 
other religions – 427; 
Non-religious – 6,496; 
Atheism – 441;
Undeclared – 11,422.

See also
List of cities and towns in Hungary

References

External links
 Postal codes of the Komárom District

Districts in Komárom-Esztergom County